Joaquín Antonio Rivas Navarro (born 26 April 1992) is a Salvadoran professional footballer who plays for USL Championship club Miami FC and the El Salvador national team.

Club career

Early career
Rivas played college soccer at the University of Nevada, Las Vegas from 2010 to 2013.

After college, Rivas appeared for USL PDL side Kitsap Pumas in 2014.

Professional
Rivas signed for United Soccer League side Tulsa Roughnecks as of the start of the 2017 season.

Rivas moved to USL side Saint Louis FC ahead of their 2019 season.

Following Saint Louis FC folding at the end of the 2020 season, Rivas returned to FC Tulsa.

In June 2022, Rivas moved to Miami FC. Tulsa received Sean McFarlane on loan in return.

International career
Rivas made his debut for the El Salvador national team on 16 November 2018 in a CONCACAF Nations League qualifier against Bermuda, as a half-time substitute for Jaime Alas.

International goals
Scores and results list El Salvador's goal tally first.

References

External links
Sacramento player profile

1992 births
Living people
El Salvador international footballers
Expatriate soccer players in the United States
Salvadoran expatriate footballers
Kitsap Pumas players
Sacramento Republic FC players
Salvadoran footballers
FC Tulsa players
Saint Louis FC players
Miami FC players
Association football forwards
UNLV Rebels men's soccer players
USL Championship players
USL League Two players
Soccer players from Nevada
Sportspeople from Las Vegas
Sportspeople from Santa Ana, El Salvador
2021 CONCACAF Gold Cup players